Michael Tebbutt (born 22 December 1970) is an Australian former tennis player.

He was educated at St Johns Park High School (Australia) and Northern Arizona University (US) before starting his career as a professional tennis player.

He was the first NAU tennis player in the NAU Athletics Hall of Fame. Tebbutt played hitting the ball with both hands, both forehand and backhand. His service was powerful and this fact made him to have his best performances in fast courts.

Michael was ranked world No. 87 in singles and No. 26 in doubles.  

In singles tournaments he had wins over Pat Rafter, Lleyton Hewitt, and Tim Henman. In doubles, he had wins over Andre Agassi, Pete Sampras and the Woodies, among others. He reached the fourth round of the US Open and third round of Australian Open in singles. He reached quarter finals at three of the Grand Slams, and overall has competed in 30+ Grand Slams.

ATP : Aces 1637 matches 147 
Aces per match : 11.13605

18th on list of most aces per match of all time..

Career finals

Doubles (2 wins, 4 losses)

External links and references
 
 
 NAU Athletics

1970 births
Living people
Australian male tennis players
Tennis players from Sydney